"Animal" is a song by German Dance music band R.I.O., featuring vocals from Pop, R&B and Hip-Hop singer U-Jean. The song was written by Yann Peifer, Manuel Reuter and Andres Ballinas. It was released in Germany as a digital download on 2 December 2011.
The song's chorus features a re-creation of the synth riff from Levels by Avicii while R.I.O. and U-Jean overdub a new vocal hook.

Music video
A music video to accompany the release of "Animal" was first released onto YouTube on 29 November 2011 at a total length of three minutes and forty-two seconds.

Track listing
Digital download
 "Animal" (Video Edit) – 3:32
 "Animal" (Extended Mix) – 5:38
 "Animal" (Spankers Edit) – 3:50
 "Animal" (Spankers Remix) – 6:05

Credits and personnel
Lead vocals – R.I.O. and U-Jean
Producers – Yann Peifer, Manuel Reuter, Tim Bergling
Lyrics – Yann Peifer, Manuel Reuter, Andres Ballinas
Label: Kontor Records

Charts

Release history

References

External links
 R.I.O. on Myspace

2011 singles
2011 songs
R.I.O. songs
Songs written by DJ Manian
Songs written by Yanou
Songs written by Andres Ballinas
Kontor Records singles